Xanthoma disseminatum is a rare cutaneous condition that preferentially affects males in childhood, characterized by the insidious onset of small, yellow-red to brown papules and nodules that are discrete and disseminated.

It is a histiocytosis syndrome.

See also 
 Non-X histiocytosis
 List of cutaneous conditions

References

External links 

Monocyte- and macrophage-related cutaneous conditions